Centretown is a neighbourhood in Somerset Ward, in central Ottawa, Ontario, Canada. It is defined by the city as "the area bounded on the north by Gloucester Street and Lisgar Street, on the east by the Rideau Canal, on the south by the Queensway freeway and on the west by Bronson Avenue." Traditionally it was all of Ottawa west of the Rideau Canal, while Lower Town was everything to the east. For certain purposes, such as the census and real estate listings, the Golden Triangle and/or Downtown Ottawa (between Gloucester/Lisgar and the Ottawa River) is included in Centretown and it is considered part of Centretown by the Centretown Citizens Community Association as well as being used in this way in casual conversation.

The total population of Centretown (south of Gloucester Street) was 23,823 according to the Canada 2016 Census.

Centretown is marked by a mix of residential and commercial properties. The main streets such as Bank Street and Elgin Street are largely commercial, while the smaller ones, notably MacLaren and Gladstone are more residential. Much of the area still consists of original single family homes, but there are newer infill and town house developments and low-rise and high-rise apartment buildings. A construction boom that began in the late nineties significantly increased the number of condominiums and other residential and commercial high-rise buildings north of Cooper Street.

Landmarks include the Canadian Museum of Nature, Dundonald Park, Jack Purcell Park, McNabb Recreation Centre, the Ottawa Curling Club, the Sens Mile and the Ottawa Central Bus Station.

Demographics
According to the Canada 2006 Census. Defined as the area of Ottawa bounded on the west by Bronson, north by Gloucester Street, east by the Rideau Canal and on the south by the Queensway.

Population: 20,513
Change (2001–2006): -3.1%
Total Private Dwellings: 14,040
Land Area: 2.1 km².
Population density: 9768.1 per km².

Precise numbers are difficult because of the large contingent of transient residents in the neighbourhood, many of whom are students or hill staffers temporarily living in Ottawa.

Mid-Centretown Design Study 

In 2009, the City of Ottawa launched a Mid-Centretown Community Design Plan study, which was to cover the area roughly bounded by "Elgin Street on the east, the 417 on the south, Kent Street on the west and the Central Area boundary/Gloucester Street on the north". Since that time, the study has come to encompass the entirety of Centretown. The design plan is targeted for completion in the fall of 2012.

Members of Parliament
The area was represented by two members from 1872 to 1935

Joseph Merrill Currier, Liberal-Conservative (1867–1882); Ottawa (City of)
John Bower Lewis, Conservative (1872–1874); Ottawa (City of)
Pierre St. Jean, Liberal (1874–1878); Ottawa (City of)
Joseph Tassé, Conservative (1878–1887); Ottawa (City of)
Charles H. Mackintosh, Conservative (1882–1887); Ottawa (City of)
W. G. Perley, Conservative (1887–1890); Ottawa (City of)
Honoré Robillard, Liberal-Conservative (1887–1896); Ottawa (City of)
Charles H. Mackintosh, Conservative (1890–1893); Ottawa (City of)
James Alexander Grant, Conservative (1893–1896); Ottawa (City of)
William H. Hutchison, Liberal (1896–1900); Ottawa (City of)
N. A. Belcourt, Liberal (1896–1907); Ottawa (City of)
Thomas Birkett, Conservative (1900–1904); Ottawa (City of)
Robert Stewart, Liberal (1904–1908); Ottawa (City of)
J. B. T. Caron, Liberal (1907–1908); Ottawa (City of)
Sir Wilfrid Laurier, Liberal (1908–1910); Ottawa (City of)
Harold B. McGiverin, Liberal (1908–1911); Ottawa (City of)
Albert Allard, Liberal (1910–1911); Ottawa (City of)
Alfred Ernest Fripp, Conservative (1911–1921); Ottawa (City of)
John Léo Chabot, Conservative (1911–1921); Ottawa (City of)
Harold B. McGiverin, Liberal (1921–1925); Ottawa (City of)
Edgar Rodolphe Chevrier, Liberal (1921–1925); Ottawa (City of)
Stewart McClenaghan, Conservative (1925–1926); Ottawa (City of)
John Léo Chabot, Conservative (1925–1926); Ottawa (City of)
Edgar Rodolphe Chevrier, Liberal (1926–1935); Ottawa (City of)
Gordon Cameron Edwards, Liberal (1926–1930); Ottawa (City of)
Thomas Franklin Ahearn, Liberal (1930–1940); Ottawa (City of) to 1935. Ottawa West from 1935
George McIlraith, Liberal (1940–1972); Ottawa West to 1968. Ottawa Centre from 1968
Hugh Poulin, Liberal (1973–1978); Ottawa Centre
Robert de Cotret, Progressive Conservative (1978–1979); Ottawa Centre
John Evans, Liberal (1979–1984); Ottawa Centre
Michael Cassidy, NDP (1984–1988); Ottawa Centre
Mac Harb, Liberal (1988–2003); Ottawa Centre
Ed Broadbent, NDP (2004–2005); Ottawa Centre
Paul Dewar, NDP (2006–2015); Ottawa Centre
Catherine McKenna, Liberal (2015–2021); Ottawa Centre
Yasir Naqvi, Liberal (2021–Present); Ottawa Centre

Centretown churches
Centretown United Church
Church of St. Barnabas, Apostle and Martyr
First Church of Christ, Scientist
First United Church
Holy Korean Martyrs Parish
Metropolitan Bible Church
Salvation Army Gladstone Community Church
St. George's Anglican Church
St Patrick's Basilica

Centretown embassies
Embassy of the Czech Republic in Ottawa
Embassy of the Federal Republic of Germany in Ottawa
Embassy of the Hellenic Republic in Ottawa
Embassy of the Republic of Croatia in Ottawa
Embassy of Iran in Ottawa
Embassy of Iraq in Ottawa
Embassy of the Republic of Madagascar in Ottawa
High Commission of the Federal Republic of Nigeria in Ottawa
Embassy of the Republic of Rwanda in Ottawa
Embassy of the Republic of Zimbabwe in Ottawa
Embassy of the Republic of Hungary in Ottawa
Embassy of El Salvador in Ottawa
Embassy of Ukraine in Ottawa

See also

List of Ottawa neighbourhoods

References 

Bibliography

External links 

Centretown History: Virtual Museum of Canada Exhibit

Neighbourhoods in Ottawa